Sant Mateu d’Albarca is a small village in the North  of the Spanish island of Ibiza. The village is in the municipality of Sant Antoni de Portmany and is located designated road PMV 804-1.

The village lies within the valley of d’Albarca. The valley is noted for its lemon and orange trees and fields of almond trees. The village is noted for its wines.

References

Populated places in Ibiza